Frederick Suppe (born 1940 in Los Angeles, California) is a professor Emeritus of philosophy at the University of Maryland.  He has prominent work in the philosophy of science including much work with the semantic view of theories.

Biography
Suppe received his Ph.D. from the University of Michigan and has research interests in the philosophy of science, epistemology and metaphysics, philosophical theology and philosophy of gender.

In 2000 he moved to Texas Tech University where he became chair of the philosophy department. In 2002 he moved to the department of Classical and Modern Languages and Literatures where he was chair from 2002 to 2010. He is currently Professor of Classics, stationed at the Texas Tech Center in Seville, Spain, which he helped develop.

His works on the semantic view of theories include Suppe, Frederick, ed. (1974), The Structure of Scientific Theories and (1989), The Semantic Conception of Theories and Scientific Realism.

See also
American philosophy
List of American philosophers
Scientific structuralism

Notes

Living people
1940 births
20th-century American philosophers
Christian philosophers
Philosophers of science
University of Michigan alumni
Texas Tech University faculty
University of Maryland, College Park faculty
People from Los Angeles